ClearVolume is an open source real-time live 3D visualization library designed for high-end volumetric light sheet microscopes. ClearVolume enables the live visualization of microscope data - allowing the biologists to immediately decide whether a sample is worth imaging. ClearVolume can easily be integrated into existing Java, C/C++, Python, or LabVIEW based microscope software. It has a dedicated interface to MicroManager/OpenSpim/OpenSpin control software. ClearVolume supports multi-channels, live 3D data streaming from remote microscopes, and uses a multi-pass Fibonacci rendering algorithm that can handle large volumes. Moreover, ClearVolume is integrated into the FiJi/ImageJ2/KNIME ecosystem.

See also
 FiJi
 KNIME
 Light sheet fluorescence microscopy
 Volume rendering

References

External links
  Website of the open source ClearVolume project with links to the wiki, code repositories and issue tracking.
  ClearVolume KNIME plugin project page.
  ClearVolume FiJi plugin project page.

Computational science
Bioinformatics